Thenpair village is one of the villages in Vikravandi block in Villupuram district, Tamil Nadu state. Villupuram to Thenpair distance is 25 km, Chennai 160 km.

References 
 

Revenue blocks of Villupuram district